Teófilo Odorico Dias de Mesquita (November 8, 1854 – March 29, 1889) was a Brazilian poet, journalist and lawyer, nephew of the famous Romantic author Gonçalves Dias.

He is the patron of the 36th chair of the Brazilian Academy of Letters.

The literary critic Alfredo Bosi considers his 1882 work Fanfarras to have launched the Parnassian movement in Brazilian literature.

Life

Teófilo Dias was born in 1854, to Odorico Antônio de Mesquita and Joana Angélica Dias de Mesquita (who was the sister of poet Gonçalves Dias). His initial schooling happened in São Luís, at the Instituto de Humanidades.

Moving to Rio de Janeiro, he was lodged in a convent for two years (1875–1876) and prepared to ingress at a Law course. In Rio, he met many influential people, such as Alberto de Oliveira, Artur de Oliveira, Aluísio Azevedo, Benjamin Constant Botelho de Magalhães, José do Patrocínio and Joaquim Maria Machado de Assis.

In 1881, he finished the Law course at the Faculdade de Direito da Universidade de São Paulo. As a journalist, he wrote for the newspapers A Província de São Paulo, A República and José Veríssimo's Revista Brasileira.

He was also a teacher of Philosophic Grammar and French in Colégio Aquino.

He married Gabriela Frederica Ribeiro de Andrada, a daughter of Martim Francisco Ribeiro de Andrada, the brother of famous statesman José Bonifácio de Andrada e Silva. He had with her two children.

He became a deputy in 1885, remaining in the post until the following year.

He died in 1889.

Works
 Flores e Amores (1874)
 Cantos Tropicais (1878)
 Lira dos Verdes Anos (1878)
 Fanfarras (1882)
 A Comédia dos Deuses (1888)

References

Footnotes

Bibliography

External links
 Three poems by Teófilo Dias 
 Excerpts of poems by Teófilo Dias at the official site of the Brazilian Academy of Letters 
 Teófilo Dias' biography at the official site of the Brazilian Academy of Letters 

1854 births
1889 deaths
19th-century Brazilian poets
Brazilian journalists
People from Maranhão
Portuguese-language writers
Patrons of the Brazilian Academy of Letters
Members of the Chamber of Deputies (Empire of Brazil)
19th-century journalists
Male journalists
Brazilian male poets
19th-century Brazilian male writers